Asianellus is a genus of jumping spiders that was first described by D. V. Logunov & S. Hęciak in 1996.

Species
 it contains five species, found only in Asia and Europe:
Asianellus festivus (C. L. Koch, 1834) (type) – Europe, Caucasus, Russia (Europe to Far East), Kazakhstan, China, Korea, Japan
Asianellus kazakhstanicus Logunov & Hęciak, 1996 – Kazakhstan, Russia (West Siberia), China
Asianellus kuraicus Logunov & Marusik, 2000 – Russia (South Siberia)
Asianellus ontchalaan Logunov & Hęciak, 1996 – Russia (Urals, South Siberia)
Asianellus potanini (Schenkel, 1963) – Armenia to China

References

External links

Features of the genus
Photograph of A. festivus

Salticidae
Salticidae genera
Spiders of Asia